Jonathan Joan España Santiago (born 13 November 1988) is a Venezuelan professional footballer who plays for Deportivo Lara as a defender.

Club career
Born in Ciudad Ojeda, Jonathan España spent four years in Venezuelan Primera División between 2010 and 2014.

On 22 June 2014 he moved abroad for the first time, joining one compatriot at Cypriot First Division club AEL Limassol.

References

External links

1988 births
Living people
Association football defenders
Venezuelan footballers
Venezuelan expatriate footballers
Venezuelan Primera División players
Trujillanos FC players
Zamora FC players
AEL Limassol players
Atlético Venezuela C.F. players
Cypriot First Division players
Expatriate footballers in Cyprus
Venezuelan expatriate sportspeople in Cyprus
People from Ciudad Ojeda
20th-century Venezuelan people
21st-century Venezuelan people